Ye'nze is the debut studio album recorded by Ugandan soul-jazz musician Sandra Nankoma. The album was produced by artist Kaz Kasozi and recorded at Little Room Studio in Kampala, Uganda and mastered in Paris, France, by David Felgeirolles.

The album was released on 22 February 2018 as a digital download in France where she had been in a three month residency (August – October, 2017) after she had won the music award Visa Pour La Creation by Institute Francaise France and on CD on 11 March 2018 at a press listening session held by Fezah App at Design Hub in Kampala.

Content
The album has a track listing of 10 songs,a poem interlude and an outro poem Paris Monster. The album presents themes about love, the daily struggles of survival, materialism, stigma against dark-skinned women, and poor political leadership in Uganda. All songs on the album were written by Sandra herself and most of the songs reflect to her life and the challenges she has gone through as a woman, and with a real darker skin. She titled the album Ye'nze, a Luganda phrase meaning It's me to reflect herself and her live on the album.

Singles
"Mercedes"
"Kaddugala"
"Baliba Baambuza"

Track listing

Credits and personnel
Sandra Nankoma – vocals, songwriter
Michael Avron– guitars
David Felgeirolles  – mastering
Christophe Pittet bass
Felix Sabal-Lecco - drums
Kaz Kasozi - Multi-instrumentalist, Sound recording and reproduction

References

2018 debut albums
Sandra Nankoma albums